Bajuk is a surname. Notable people with the surname include:

 Andrej Bajuk (1943–2011), Slovenian politician and economist
 Lidija Bajuk (born 1965), Croatian singer-songwriter and poet